Southern Suburbs F.C. was a South African football club. Founded as Southern Park F.C., they competed in the National Football League.

References

National Football League (South Africa) clubs
Defunct soccer clubs in South Africa